Matthew Simon Russell Palmer  (born 12 May 1964) is a New Zealand judge, legal academic and former public servant.

Palmer graduated with a BA in Economics & Political Science from University of Canterbury in 1983. This was followed by a LLB (Hons) (First Class) in 1987. Then a LLM & JSD from Yale Law School in 1993.

Palmer was the Pro Vice-Chancellor (Government Relations), Dean of Law, and Director of the New Zealand Centre for Public Law at Victoria University of Wellington from January 2001 until June 2007. He has also held positions in the Treasury and has been Deputy Secretary of Justice (Public Law) in the New Zealand Ministry of Justice and Deputy Solicitor-General (Public Law) in the New Zealand Crown Law Office.

He is son of former Prime Minister Sir Geoffrey Palmer, who was also a professor of law at Victoria University for many years. 

Matthew Palmer is author of The Treaty of Waitangi in New Zealand's Law and Constitution, which was published in November 2008. He also co-authored (with his father) Bridled Power, a leading text on New Zealand public law.

On 16 October 2015, Palmer was appointed a Justice of High Court of New Zealand.

References

External links
Farewell speech
Book description

High Court of New Zealand judges
Academic staff of the Victoria University of Wellington
New Zealand legal scholars
New Zealand public servants
Living people
1964 births
New Zealand King's Counsel
Children of prime ministers of New Zealand